Stade de la Fontenette is a football stadium in Carouge, Switzerland. It is the home ground of Étoile Carouge FC and has a capacity of 7,200.

References 
https://int.soccerway.com/venues/switzerland/stade-de-la-fontenette/

See also
List of football stadiums in Switzerland

Football venues in Switzerland
Carouge
Buildings and structures in the canton of Geneva